MP Materials Corp. is an American rare-earth materials company headquartered in Las Vegas, Nevada. MP Materials owns and operates the Mountain Pass mine, the only operating rare earth mine and processing facility in the United States. MP Materials focuses its production on Neodymium-Praseodymium (NdPr), a rare earth material used in high-strength permanent magnets that power the traction motors found in electric vehicles, robotics, wind turbines, drones and other advanced motion technologies. MP Materials is listed on the New York Stock Exchange under the ticker symbol "MP". As of December 2021, JHL Capital Group, QVT Financial and CEO James Litinsky were the company’s three largest shareholders, with about 7.7% of the company owned by Shenghe Resources, a Chinese rare earth business located in Sichuan.

History
In 2015, Molycorp, the previous owners of the Mountain Pass mine, filed for bankruptcy. At the time, it was the only U.S. producer of rare earth elements. While in bankruptcy, Secure Natural Resources (SNR), a company owned by Molycorp's creditors, including JHL Capital Group, gained control of the mine's mineral rights. In June 2017, the Mountain Pass mine was purchased at auction for $20.5 million by a new entity called MP Mine Operations LLC (MPMO). MPMO was a consortium formed principally by JHL Capital Group, a Chicago-based investment firm led by James Litinsky, along with QVT Financial LP and Shenghe Resources. Shenghe, a Sichuan China rare earth company, held a minority, non-voting interest. At the time, Mountain Pass was in a state of "care and maintenance" and had only eight employees according to Litinsky.

Following the asset acquisitions and formation of the entities that became MP Materials, the company restarted operations at Mountain Pass. On July 15, 2020, the company announced a reverse takeover whereby MPMO and SNR would be merged with Fortress Value Acquisition Corporation to become a public company under the name MP Materials Corp. The transaction, which closed on November 17, 2020, raised $545 million. On November 18, 2020, MP Materials began trading on the New York Stock Exchange under the symbol "MP".

In December 2021, MP Materials signed a long-term agreement with General Motors to provide neodymium-iron-boron magnets for use in GM's electric vehicle motors. As part of the contract, MP Materials also agreed to provide alloy and finished magnets to GM for its electric vehicles and to open a new factory located in Fort Worth, Texas to produce the magnets. 

As of December 2021, JHL Capital Group, QVT Financial, and CEO James Litinsky were the company's three largest shareholders, and about 7.7% of the company was owned by Shenghe Resources, a Chinese company. Apart from institutions, other investors own 18%.

Mountain Pass mine

Discovered in 1949 in San Bernardino County, California, Mountain Pass mine consists of a bastnäsite ore-body with significant concentrations of rare earth elements. The mine once supplied most of the world's rare earth elements. Mountain Pass is the only operational rare earth mining and processing facility in the United States. The expected Mountain Pass mine life is approximately 24 years.
 
MP Materials produced 28,000 tonnes of rare-earth oxide equivalent from Mountain Pass in 2019, and 38,500 tonnes in 2020, or more than 15% of global production. As of late 2020, Shenghe Resources was the sole purchaser of MP Material's rare earth concentrate.

U.S. government contracts
In July 2020, the United States Department of Defense issued a preliminary contract to MP Materials intended to restore domestic heavy rare earth production and separation capabilities to the United States. In November 2020, the United States Department of Defense awarded MP Materials $9.6 million as part of a government effort to increase domestic production of rare earth materials.

In 2021, MP Materials received $3 million in funding from the United States Department of Energy to design and study the feasibility of a system to produce rare earth oxides and metals from coal by-products in collaboration with the University of Kentucky.

In February 2022, U.S. President Joe Biden announced at a press conference that the United States Department of Defense was investing $35 million into MP Materials as part of an effort to spur domestic rare earth production in the United States. Biden said that this move was designed to reduce America's reliance on rare earth minerals imported from other countries. The Biden Administration said the federal funding is earmarked to assist the company to develop a new commercial facility for “heavy” rare earth mineral processing.

References

External links 

Companies listed on the New York Stock Exchange
Companies based in Las Vegas
Rare earth companies
2017 establishments in Nevada
Special-purpose acquisition companies
2020 mergers and acquisitions